Kenny de Schepper (born 29 May 1987) is a French professional tennis player.

Career
De Schepper was born in Bordeaux, France. His father Éric, originally from Belgium, was a former professional squash player. De Schepper, who is two meters tall, joined the National tennis centre in Poitiers when he was 13, however after a while he stopped playing tennis for two years due to growth injuries. He subsequently resumed and eventually turned pro in 2010.

2011
While not having any wins, he had several runner-up finishes in ITF Futures events and has a runner-up finish at an ATP Challenger event – the 2011 Open EuroEnergie de Quimper, where he lost to his compatriot David Guez in the final.

He won his first ATP Challenger title at the 2011 Open Diputación Ciudad de Pozoblanco event against Iván Navarro.

De Schepper made the main draw of the 2011 Wimbledon Championships.  In the 2011 Wimbledon Championships qualifiers he defeated Ádám Kellner (Q1), Matthew Ebden (Q2), and Simone Bolelli (Q3).

2012
In October 2012, de Schepper won consecutive Challenger tournaments, taking him to a career high ranking of 123 in singles. The first of the two Challenger victories came in Mons, having qualified for the tournament, before securing a title in Rennes a week later, not dropping a set throughout the competition.

2013

De Schepper once again played at Wimbledon and this time progressed to the fourth round, the first time he had made the last 16 at a Grand Slam tournament, courtesy of wins over Paolo Lorenzi, Marin Čilić (by walkover) and Juan Mónaco. De Schepper faced Fernando Verdasco in the round of 16 and lost in straight sets. At the US Open, he lost in the first round to Bradley Klahn in four sets with three tie-breaks.

2015
De Schepper reached the first round of the Australian Open, losing to Lukáš Rosol in 5 sets.  He lost in the first round of qualifying at the French Open.  He advanced through the  qualifiers to reach the 2nd round of the Wimbledon Championships before losing to Richard Gasquet in straight sets, with Gasquet reaching the semifinals.

2016
De Schepper opened his season by representing France at the 2016 Hopman Cup with teammate Caroline Garcia. He played against Andy Murray, Alexander Zverev and Nick Kyrgios, but did not record any wins.

2017
De Schepper qualified into the main draw in Montpellier, falling to eventual finalist Richard Gasquet in the Quarter-Finals. De Schepper defeated Mischa Zverev and Illya Marchenko in the process. He reached the same stage in Metz, before Mischa Zverev avenged his earlier defeat.

Challenger and Futures/World Tennis Tour Finals

Singles: 20 (8–12)

Doubles: 7 (1–6)

Singles performance timeline

Wins over top-10 players

Notes

References

External links
 
 

1987 births
French male tennis players
Living people
French people of Flemish descent
French people of Belgian descent
Hopman Cup competitors
Tennis players from Bordeaux